Konstantinos "Kostas" Christofidelis (Greek: Κώστας Χριστοφιδέλης; born ) is former a Greek male volleyball player. He was part of the Greece men's national volleyball team. He competed with the national team at the 2004 Summer Olympics in Athens, Greece.

Honours

 Greek Championship (11)
 1998, 1999, 2000, 2001, 2003, 2009, 2012, 2013, 2014, 2018, 2019
 Greek Cup (9)
 1997, 1998, 1999, 2001, 2009, 2010, 2012, 2013, 2014
 Greek League Cup (4)
 2013, 2015, 2018, 2019
 Greek Super Cup (1)
 2000
 CEV  Cup (2)
 1996, 2005

See also
 Greece at the 2004 Summer Olympics

References

External links
 profile, club career, info at greekvolley.gr (in Greek)

1977 births
Living people
Greek men's volleyball players
Volleyball players at the 2004 Summer Olympics
Olympic volleyball players of Greece
Olympiacos S.C. players
Panathinaikos V.C. players
Iraklis V.C. players
Sportspeople from Kavala